The 1983 Major League Baseball All-Star Game was the 54th edition of the midsummer classic between the all-stars of the American League (AL) and National League (NL), the two leagues comprising Major League Baseball. The game was held on July 6 at Comiskey Park in Chicago, Illinois, the home of the Chicago White Sox of the American League. The Wednesday night game resulted in a 13–3 American League victory. The game celebrated the fiftieth anniversary of the All-Star Game, and occurred exactly 50 years to the date of the first All-Star game, also at Comiskey Park. This was the 54th game, as no game was held in 1945, while two were held each year from 1959 through 1962.

This was the fifth All-Star Game played in Chicago, and the third to be hosted by the White Sox at Comiskey Park (1933, 1950), with two by the Chicago Cubs at Wrigley Field (1947, 1962).  This was the last time the All-Star Game was played in the venue where the annual exhibition began.  When the White Sox next hosted the All-Star Game twenty years later in 2003, they had moved across the street to their new home at U.S. Cellular Field.

The game was the first American League win in twelve years, and only the second AL win since 1962. The thirteen runs scored by the American League set a new record for one team in All-Star Game history.  The ten-run margin of victory was the largest since the 12–0 American League victory in 1946.

The game is perhaps best remembered for Fred Lynn's grand slam off Atlee Hammaker of the Giants, part of a big third inning for the home team. During that third inning, the American League set All-Star Game records for the most hits (6) and runs (7) by a single team in their half-inning - all off Hammaker.

Prior to the first pitch, Chuck Mangione played the Canadian national anthem on his flugelhorn, while the Oak Ridge Boys sang the Star-Spangled Banner.  The colors were presentated by the Great Lakes Naval Training Center Color Guard, which previously presented at the 1947, 1950, and 1963 games; they did the honors again in 1990 and 2003.

For this golden anniversary, there was also an "Old Timer's Game" played on Tuesday, the day before the All-Star game. Because Independence Day was on Monday this year, the All-Star break did not begin until that evening, as the holiday included a full slate of day games.

Rosters
Players in italics have since been inducted into the National Baseball Hall of Fame.

National League

American League

Game

Umpires
George Maloney was the last home plate umpire to work an All-Star game wearing the outside chest protector long favored by umpires in the American League. Maloney was one of only four active umpires in 1983 still using the outside protector. He and Russ Goetz retired following the 1983 season. Bill Kunkel soldiered on while battling cancer, succumbing in May 1985. Jerry Neudecker, the last outside protector holdout, retired after the 1985 season.

Starting lineups

Game summary

The first inning gave notice that this would be one of the sloppiest All-Star games in history.  Steve Sax led off the game by reaching on an error by AL starting pitcher Dave Stieb.  Sax stole second and scored when next batter Tim Raines grounded to Stieb and Stieb threw wildly past Rod Carew at first.  Raines reached third, but couldn't score as Stieb struck out the side; Andre Dawson, Dale Murphy, and Mike Schmidt all fanned.

The AL tied it in their half of the first on a sacrifice fly by George Brett and took the lead in the second on another sac fly by Robin Yount.  The Giants' Atlee Hammaker came in to pitch for the NL in the bottom of the third and promptly had one of the worst innings by a pitcher in All-Star Game history.  Jim Rice led off with a homer, followed by a Brett triple.  Dave Winfield singled home Brett.  Manny Trillo singled, and Carew drove home Winfield with a two-out single.  Hammaker then intentionally walked right-handed hitter Yount to face Fred Lynn, a left-handed hitter.  Lynn made the NL pay for the move with the only grand slam hit in All-Star game history.  When the dust cleared, the AL had a 9-1 lead and Hammaker had given up six hits and seven runs in an inning, both All-Star game records that still stand.

The NL gamely fought back on RBI singles by Murphy in the fourth and Sax in the fifth, but that was all they would get.  In the seventh, Lou Whitaker had an RBI triple and Willie Wilson an RBI double for the AL.  The AL capped off the scoring when Brett scored on a fly ball hit by Whitaker that Pedro Guerrero dropped and Rickey Henderson drove in Cecil Cooper with a groundout.

Footnotes and references

External links
Baseball-Reference.com
Lineups, boxscore, and more

Major League Baseball All-Star Game
Major League Baseball All-Star Game
Baseball in Chicago
1980s in Chicago
1983 in Illinois
Major League Baseball All Star Game
July 1983 sports events in the United States
Sports competitions in Chicago